Roseland Public Schools or Roseland Elementary School District is a school district headquartered in Santa Rosa, California.

Schools
Preschool:
Apples and Banana 4C's Preschool

Kindergarten-grade 6:
Sheppard Accelerated Elementary School
Roseland Elementary School
Roseland Creek Elementary

Grades 7-8:
Roseland Accelerated Middle School

Secondary schools:
Roseland Collegiate Prep (middle and high school; grades 7-10 but will become 7–12)
Roseland University Prep (grades 9–12)

References

External links
 

School districts in Sonoma County, California